Kepler-15 is a G-type main sequence star with a mass of . It is also known as KOI-128, or KIC 11359879.

Planetary system
Kepler-15 is orbited by one known planet Kepler-15b discovered by transit method in 2011.

References

Cygnus (constellation)
G-type main-sequence stars
Planetary systems with one confirmed planet
Planetary transit variables
128
J19444814+4908244